The Journal of Social Issues is a quarterly peer-reviewed academic journal published by Wiley-Blackwell on behalf of the Society for the Psychological Study of Social Issues along with Analyses of Social Issues and Public Policy and Social Issues and Policy Review. The journal was established in 1945. The editor-in-chief is Carey S. Ryan (University of Nebraska Omaha). The journal covers human and social issues such as poverty, privacy, youth violence, social class, and education.  

According to the Journal Citation Reports, the journal has a 2020 impact factor of 3.424, ranking it 10th out of 44 journals in the category "Social Issues".

A central article on occupational burnout was published in the journal in 1974.

References

External links 
 

Wiley-Blackwell academic journals
English-language journals
Publications established in 1945
Quarterly journals
Social psychology journals